Gandhari is a 1993 Indian Malayalam-language action film directed by Sunil and written by Sab John. The film stars Madhavi, Babu Antony and Siddique. The film tells the story of a woman who wants to take revenge on the people who had once cheated her with a fake drug case and tortured her.

Plot
Madhavi (Aparna) is rich enough to hire anybody. Madhavi hires babu Antony with his friend Zainuddin and two other friends. Madhavi want to get revenge against Soman and Rajan P. Dev, who earlier, arrested, made false evidence, put Madhavi in jail and also tortured her inside the jail for a new cocaine type drug formula. The drug formula detail was given by her professor Charuhasan to the two villains. But Madhavi never gave the formula.

For the formula, the villains kill Sai Kumar, husband of Madhavi and make it as a case of suicide. Madhavi comes out of jail after jail punishment, but again gets attacked by local goons. Madhavi jumps into the river, escapes to Mumbai and works there with the underworld and makes money. Madhavi comes back now mainly for revenge and also care for her daughter who is in an orphanage now.

The first professor gets killed by Babu Antony and friends by closing him in a room and making loud noise with musical instruments. Professor, echo phobic dies. Then Soman catches Zainuddin and along with Rajan P. dev beats Zainuddin to death. Soman gets killed next. Finally, Rajan P. Dev is tied head down and the rope is being burnt by a lit candle. By the time Sidique comes, the rope gets cut by the lit candle and Rajan P. Dev falls head down with the blood splashing onto Siddique's face. At the end, Madhavi comes to see his daughter and while coming out gets arrested  by Siddique for justice.

Cast
 Madhavi as Aparna / Malini Laxman
 Babu Antony as Vishnu
 Siddique as CI Jayaram
 Zainuddin as Zainuddin
 Kalabhavan Anzar as Hari
 Rajan P Dev as Ittichen
 Sai Kumar as Laxman
 Charuhasan as Prof. Ramamoorthy
 M. G. Soman as Commissioner Sathyanath IPS
 Jose Pellissery as Shiva Prasad
 Jagathy Sreekumar as Scud Kuttappan
 Riza Bava as Minister

References

External links
 

1990s Malayalam-language films
1993 films
Films directed by Sunil